is a member of the Japanese idol girl group NMB48. She is the current captain of NMB48's Team M. She is also a member of the AKB48 sub-unit Tentoumu Chu!, of NMB48 sub-unit Queentet, and formerly held a concurrent position in AKB48's Team 4.

Biography 
Shibuya passed NMB48's 4th generation auditions. Her debut was in December 2012. Her stage debut was in February 2013.

In October 2013, together with Tentoumu Chu!, she was cast for the drama . In November 2013, she was selected to be the center of NMB48's coupling track on AKB48's single Suzukake Nanchara.

In February 2014, during AKB48's Group Shuffle, she was promoted to Team BII and also started holding a concurrent position in AKB48's Team 4. Her first NMB48 Senbatsu was for the single Takane no Ringo.

On October 18, 2016, during NMB48 Team Shuffle, she was transferred to Team M, taking effect on January 1, 2017.

On May 18, 2018, Shibuya's concurrent position in AKB48's Team 4 was terminated.

On January 1, 2019, during NMB48's new year event, Shibuya was promoted as captain of Team M, starting on March 1.

Discography

NMB48 singles

AKB48 singles

Appearances

Stage Units 
NMB48 Kenkyuusei Stage "Seishun Girls"
 "Kinjirareta Futari"
 "Fushidara na Natsu"

Team BII 3rd Stage "Saka Agari"
 "Mushi no Ballad"

Team 4 3rd Stage "Idol no Yoake"
 "Kataomoi no Taikakusen"

Variety Shows 
 AKBINGO!
 Tentoumu Chu! no Sekai o Muchuu ni Sasemasu Sengen
 AKB48 Show!

Dramas 
 Joshikou Keisatsu (2014)
 Cabasuka Gakuen (2016) as Hachikō

External links 
 NMB48 Official Profile
 AKB48 Official Profile
 Official Blog
 Nagisa Shibuya on Google+
 Nagisa Shibuya on Twitter

References 

1996 births
Living people
Japanese idols
Japanese women pop singers
People from Osaka Prefecture
Musicians from Osaka Prefecture
NMB48 members
AKB48 members